Narayam is a 1993 Indian Malayalam-language film, directed by Sasi Sankar and starring Murali and Urvashi in lead roles. At 41st National Film Awards, it won the award for Best Film on Other Social Issues.

Plot
Gayathri born into an impoverished Hindu Namboothiri family in Palakkad takes up the post of teaching Arabic in a school in Kozhikode. There she is supported in her decision by writer and social activist Shekharan a widower with an only child and the manager of the school, Hajiyar. The prospect of a Hindu woman teaching Arabic to Muslim students leads to communal problems mainly led by three people, Menon who wants to take over the school management; by Hajiyar's son-in-law Azeez who happened to take bribe for appointing a Muslim as Arabic teacher at the school; and the shrewd politician Chelakkadan who is waiting for an opportunity to unleash a communal riot and thereby reap electoral votes.

Cast
 Urvashi as Gayathri
 Murali as Shekharan
 Kalpana
 Prathapachandran as Menon
 Vijayaraghavan as Azeez
 Aboobacker
 Jagadish
 Kuthiravattam Pappu
 M. R. Gopakumar as Damodharan Namboothiri
 M. S. Thripunithura as Iyer
 Mamukkoya
 N. F. Varghese as Chelakkadan	
 Santha Devi
 Santhakumari
 V. K. Sreeraman as Hajiyar

References

External links
 

1993 films
1990s Malayalam-language films
Best Film on Other Social Issues National Film Award winners
Films directed by Sasi Shanker